Behind The Player: Tommy Clufetos is an Interactive Music Video featuring Rob Zombie drummer Tommy Clufetos. Released on November 1, 2008 by IMV, the DVD features Tommy giving in-depth drum lessons for how to play "Lords of Salem"" and "American Witch" by Rob Zombie and an intimate behind-the scenes look at his life as a professional musician, including rare photos and video.  The DVD also includes Tommy jamming the two tracks with Rob Zombie bassist Blasko, VideoTab that shows exactly how Tommy plays his parts in the two songs, as well as other bonus material.

IMV donates $.25 from the sale of each Behind the Player DVD to Little Kids Rock, an organization that gets instruments in the hands of underprivileged kids.

Contents
Behind The Player
Tommy talks about his background, influences and gear, including rare photos and video

"Lords of Salem" by Rob Zombie
Lesson: Tommy gives an in-depth drum lesson for how to play the song
Jam: Tommy jams the track with Rob Zombie bassist Blasko

"American Witch" by Rob Zombie
Lesson: Tommy gives an in-depth drum lesson for how to play the song
Jam: Tommy jams the track with Rob Zombie bassist Blasko

Special features
Bonus Video Clip
Little Kids Rock promotional video

Personnel

Produced By: Ken Mayer & Sean E Demott
Directed By: Leon Melas
Executive Producer: Rick Donaleshen
Director Of Photography: Ken Barrows
Sound Engineer: John Lousteau
Edited By: Jeff Morose
Mixed By: Matt Chidgey & Cedrick Courtois
Graphics By: Thayer Demay
Camera Operators: Mike Chateneuf, Brian Silva, Doug Cragoe
Technical Director: Tyler Bourns

Gaffer: John Parker
Assistant Director: Matt Pick
Lighting And Grip: Mcnulty Nielson
Artist Hospitality: Sasha Mayer
Shot At: Studio 606
Special Guests: John 5 & Blasko
Cover Photo By: Chad Lee
Video Courtesy Of: The Chop Shop, John 5, Piggy D, Rob Zombie, Ted Nugent,  Christopher Cymbaluk
Photos Courtesy Of: Neil Zlozower, Chad Lee, The Chop Shop, Will Thompson

References

External links
Official website

Behind the Player